Don Bosco Senior Secondary School is a well-known co-ed school located in the Vaduthala locality of Kochi, Kerala, India. It was established in 1985 as The English Medium School with the aim of providing English medium education to the students of the locality. The school was initially recognized by the Kerala Government syllabus but lost its recognition in 1987 along with other schools. Despite the setbacks, the school management made several attempts to renew the recognition and finally succeeded in 1991 when the school was raised to the status of an Upper Primary School.

The school faced difficulties in procuring permission to start a high school under Kerala syllabus, so it decided to adopt the Indian Council for Secondary Certificate (ICSE) syllabus in 1997. The Pre-Primary and Lower Primary Schools were established that followed the ICSE syllabus. The school has grown in the coming years and has become a Higher Secondary School. In March 2000, the school received permanent recognition from the ICSE Board New Delhi.

Don Bosco Senior Secondary School is a leading educational institution in Kochi, providing quality education to over 1410 students from LKG to 12th standard. The majority of the students are from the Vaduthala locality. The school has over 100 staff members who contribute to imparting education efficiently. The school has a reputation for having excellent infrastructural facilities that support the academic and extracurricular activities of the students.

The school organizes several programs throughout the year to promote social awareness among students. These programs include Anti-Drug Day, Environment Day, Street Dance, Pet Show, Fire Safety, My Big Family, Colours Day, Little Chef, and sports, cultural, and arts festivals and events. Such unique programs help students develop a civic sense and grow as responsible citizens.

Don Bosco Senior Secondary School also has a social reach-out program called "I Share." The program takes initiatives in house construction, medical treatment, scholarship for poor students, distribution of food packets, and other similar activities. The children of the school raise the required funds for these initiatives by saving one rupee per day and through fests and other programs.

The school has had several Principals who have contributed to its growth and success. Rev. Fr. Varghese Edathichira S.D.B. is the current Principal of the school. He leads the school with able guidance, maintaining the school's reputation as one of the top schools in Kochi.

Overall, Don Bosco Senior Secondary School is a renowned educational institution in Kochi that provides quality education to students from all backgrounds. It has a strong focus on extracurricular activities and social awareness programs that help students develop into responsible citizens.`

References 

Salesian secondary schools
Catholic secondary schools in India
Christian schools in Kerala
Schools in Ernakulam district